SSAK3 is a seasonal South Korean supergroup formed on the MBC variety show Hangout with Yoo. The group consists of members Yoo Jae-suk, Lee Hyori and Rain, using the stage names U-Doragon, Linda G and B.Ryong, respectively. They made their debut with the single "Beach Again" on July 25, 2020. The group members have planned for the group to potentially be a seasonal group promoting during summer and winter.

History
In May 2020, comedian Yoo Jae-suk announced on his MBC variety show Hangout with Yoo that he plans to launch a co-ed singing group that summer. Later that month, singers Lee Hyo-ri and Rain joined Yoo's group, which they named SSAK3. The group debuted on July 25, performing their 90s-style single "Beach Again" on Show! Music Core. The song topped various South Korean real-time music charts, and was ranked number one on the Gaon Digital Chart for five consecutive weeks. The group also released "In The Summer", a cover of the 1994 song by Deux, and "Play That Summer", as well as three solo tracks, all of which performed well commercially. 

The group's success was criticized by some netizens and those in the music industry, claiming that SSAK3 had an unfair advantage because of the publicity they received from Hangout with Yoo, their ties with MBC and the fact that all three were well-known and established industry veterans. In response, MBC noted that all proceeds from SSAK3's album sales and promotions will be donated to charities.

Members
Yoo Jae-suk (U-Doragon)
 Lee Hyori (Linda G)
 Rain (B.Ryong)

Discography

Albums

Singles

Videography

Music videos

References

External links
 Official website 
 Official YouTube Channel 

South Korean co-ed groups
2020 establishments in South Korea
K-pop music groups
Musical groups established in 2020
Musical groups from Seoul
South Korean idol groups
South Korean musical trios
Supergroups (music)